Jaana is a feminine given name which is the short from of Marianne and a pet form of Johanna. It is common in Estonia and Finland; the feminine version of Jaan.

People
 Jaana Padrik (born 1958), Estonian journalist and politician
 Jaana Pelkonen (born 1977), Finnish politician and television host
 Jaana Kunitz (born 1972), Finnish ballroom dancer
 Jaana Saarinen (born  1955), Finnish actress
 Jaana Savolainen (born 1964), Finnish, cross-country skier

In fiction
 Jaana the druid, fictional character in Ultima game series.

References

Estonian feminine given names
Finnish feminine given names